The 1927 New York Yankees season was their inaugural season in the league. The team finished 7–8–1, and finished sixth in the league.

Schedule

Standings

References

New York Yankees (NFL) seasons
New York Yankees
New York Yankees (NFL)
1920s in the Bronx